The Time Has Come is the debut studio album by American indie rock musician Cassie Ramone, released on August 26, 2014, by Loglady Records. It features Ariel Pink on bass for several tracks. A limited cassette edition was released for Cassette Store Day 2014.

Track list
All songs written by Cassie Ramone.

Personnel
Musicians
 Cassie Ramone – vocals, guitar, mixing
 Ariel Pink – bass 

Production
Jay Heiselmann – mastering

References

2014 debut albums